Flying Coffin is a pejorative term for an aircraft perceived by crews or the public to have a poor safety record or low combat effectiveness.

First World War and Earlier 
 Airco DH.4, a British two-seat biplane day bomber also called a "flaming coffin" with original fuel tank configuration
 Airco DH.6, a British military trainer biplane used by the Royal Flying Corps
 Georges Levy G.L.40, a three-seated French, amphibious biplane
 Hansa-Brandenburg D.I, also known as the KD (Kampf Doppeldecker) was a German fighter aircraft
 Royal Aircraft Factory B.E.2, a British single-engine tractor two-seat biplane also called "Fokker fodder"

Interwar Period 
 Brewster F2A Buffalo, an American fighter aircraft which saw service early in World War II
 Potez 540, a French multi-role aircraft which saw service in the Spanish Civil War

Second World War 
 Curtiss C-46 Commando, a twin-engine pressurized high-altitude transport aircraft
 Heinkel He 177 Greif, a long-range heavy bomber flown by the Luftwaffe also called a "flaming coffin"
 Lavochkin-Gorbunov-Gudkov LaGG-3, a Soviet fighter aircraft built extensively with wood
 Martin B-26 Marauder, an American twin-engined medium bomber

1945-Present 
 Lockheed F-104 Starfighter, an American Cold War-era single-engine, supersonic interceptor aircraft also used by the German Air Force
 Mikoyan-Gurevich MiG-21, a Soviet supersonic jet fighter and interceptor aircraft

See Also
 Coffin corner (disambiguation)
 Widow maker (disambiguation)